West Invercargill is a suburb of New Zealand's southernmost city, Invercargill.

The population was 126 in the 2013 census. This was a decrease of 54 people since the 2006 Census.

References

Suburbs of Invercargill